Steve Haworth (September 19, 1961 – December 8, 1998) was an American football defensive back. He played for the Atlanta Falcons from 1983 to 1984.

References

1961 births
1998 deaths
American football defensive backs
Oklahoma Sooners football players
Atlanta Falcons players